Suining–Chongqing railway is a high-speed railway connecting Chongqing and Suining, Sichuan as part of the Shanghai–Wuhan–Chengdu high-speed railway. It is also known as Suiyu railway, following the Chinese practice of combining the shortened version of the terminal city's name.

Overview
It is classed as a national railway grade I, with two electrified lines, designed for maximum speed of 250 kilometers. The second stage of the railway on December 31, 2012 officially launched operations.

History
Suiyu railway commenced with a ground-breaking ceremony on February 25, 2003. Stage one of track laying across the board was completed on April 23, 2005. Stage one was opened on April 1, 2006 after a total investment of 4.925 billion yuan. The trial was commenced in September 2004, taking until January 2007 to complete the test.

The railway is part of Chengyu high-speed railway and achieved connection with the railway from Chengdu to Suining. The combined operating distance from Chongqing to Chengdu is only , the entire running time of about 2 hours. On September 26, 2009, at Chongqing North Railway Station started services bound for Chengdu with CRH1 Harmony EMU trainsets, allowing Southwest China to enter the high-speed rail era.

This saw the creation of Suinan South station and a new alignment from Aikawa to Shizhishan. Work on this upgrade commenced on January 18, 2009, with construction lasting for four years. This stage of the project was estimated to need a total investment of 4.81 billion yuan. Chongqing railway new tier on January 24, 2013, officially launched operation.

References

External links

 China Railway Construction slogan "Made in China" s first non-ballasted track winning 
 Suiyu speed train line ran the country first (Xinhua)
 CRH2 be 160 km/h test in non-ballasted track on YouTube
 CRH2 be 220 km/h test in non- ballasted track on YouTube

2006 establishments in China
Railway lines opened in 2006
High-speed railway lines in China
Standard gauge railways in China
Rail transport in Chongqing